Joe Satriani is the sixth studio album by guitarist Joe Satriani, released in October 1995 through Relativity Records. This was his last album for Relativity, as he would switch record labels to Epic (or Sony Music) for his next eleven albums. Joe Satriani reached No. 51 on the U.S. Billboard 200 and remained on that chart for seven weeks, as well as reaching the top 100 in four other countries. "(You're) My World" was released as a single, reaching No. 30 on Billboard'''s Mainstream Rock chart and receiving a nomination for Best Rock Instrumental Performance at the 1997 Grammy Awards, Satriani's seventh such nomination.

Overview
The album is a slight departure from Satriani's previous instrumental rock stylings, instead showcasing a more laid back, blues-laden sound with less reliance on effects and overdubs. Recorded in the space of a few weeks, Satriani also relinquished his usual production duties to Glyn Johns (of Led Zeppelin, The Who and The Rolling Stones fame). "S.M.F." stands for "Sick Mother Fucker".

ReissuesJoe Satriani has been reissued twice. The first was on June 16, 2008 as part of the Original Album Classics box set, and most recently as part of The Complete Studio Recordings'', released on April 22, 2014 through Legacy Recordings; this is a box set compilation containing remastered editions of every Satriani studio album from 1986 to 2013.

Track listing

Personnel

Joe Satriani – vocals, guitar, Dobro, harp, bass (track 11)
Andy Fairweather Low – guitar (tracks 1–5, 7–10, 12)
Eric Valentine – piano (track 1), keyboard, percussion (track 4), bass (track 4), engineering (tracks 1, 4, 6)
Manu Katché – drums (tracks 1–3, 5, 7–10, 12)
Ethan Johns – drums (track 4)
Jeff Campitelli – drums (track 11)
Gregg Bissonette – percussion (track 6)
Nathan East – bass (tracks 1–3, 5, 7–10, 12)
Matt Bissonette – bass (track 6)
Steve Holroyd – engineering (tracks 1–5, 7–10, 12)
John Cuniberti – engineering (tracks 4, 6, 7, 11)
Kevin Scott – engineering assistance (tracks 1–10, 12)
Rhoades Howe – engineering assistance (tracks 4, 6)
Stephan Hart – engineering assistance (tracks 7, 11)
Bob Ludwig – mastering
Glyn Johns – mixing, production

Charts

Sales

Awards

References

External links
Joe Satriani at satriani.com

Joe Satriani albums
1995 albums
Relativity Records albums
Albums produced by Glyn Johns
Grammy Award for Best Rock Instrumental Performance